Relativity is an American drama television series which followed a twenty-something couple, Isabel Lukens (played by Kimberly Williams) and Leo Roth (played by David Conrad), and the lives and loves of their friends and siblings in Los Angeles. The short-lived ABC series was the product of thirtysomething producers Edward Zwick and Marshall Herskovitz (who also produced Once and Again and My So-Called Life, two other critically acclaimed series).  The series ran on ABC from September 24, 1996 until April 14, 1997; it was canceled after 17 episodes due to low ratings. The first open-mouth kiss between two women on prime time television occurred on the show in 1997.

Cast
 Kimberly Williams as Isabel Lukens
 David Conrad as Leo Roth
 Jane Adams as Karen Lukens
 Randall Batinkoff as Everett
 Cliff De Young as David Lukens
 Lisa Edelstein as Rhonda Roth
 Adam Goldberg as Doug
 Devon Gummersall as Jake Roth
 Robert Katims as Hal Roth
 Poppy Montgomery as Jennifer Lukens
 Richard Schiff as Barry Roth
 Mary Ellen Trainor as Eve Lukens

Episodes

References

External links
 
 Review: Relativity on AllYourScreens

1990s American drama television series
American Broadcasting Company original programming
1996 American television series debuts
1997 American television series endings
Television shows set in Los Angeles
1990s American LGBT-related drama television series
English-language television shows
Television series by 20th Century Fox Television